The William Harmon House, also known as Rivenes House, is a National Registered Historic Place located in Miles City, Montana, United States.  It was added to the Register on September 25, 1986, and served as the first mayoral residence of Miles City.

It is a two-and-a-half-story brick house built on a sandstone foundation.  It originally, in 1887, had an elaborate porch leading to the entrance in the southwest corner of the house.  It was modified during 1903–1910 to add a wraparound porch.

References

Houses in Custer County, Montana
Houses on the National Register of Historic Places in Montana
Buildings and structures in Miles City, Montana
National Register of Historic Places in Custer County, Montana
Houses completed in 1887
Queen Anne architecture in Montana
Victorian architecture in Montana